Abahlali baseMjondolo (AbM, in English: "the people of the shacks") is a socialist shack dwellers' movement in South Africa which campaigns both against evictions and for public housing. The movement grew out of a road blockade organised from the Kennedy Road shack settlement in the city of Durban in early 2005 and expanded to the cities of Pietermaritzburg and Cape Town. It is the largest shack dwellers' organisation in South Africa, campaigning to improve the living conditions of poor people and to democratise society from below. 

Abahlali baseMjondolo has held demonstrations, engaged in direct action such as land occupations, self-organised water and electricity connections and used the courts tactically. It defeated the KwaZulu-Natal Slums Act of 2007 and protested against the effects of the 2010 FIFA World Cup such as evictions and xenophobic attacks. AbM has historically refused party politics, and has boycotted elections in the past under the banner of No Land! No House! No Vote!. It has a history of conflict with the ruling African National Congress (ANC). It has tactically supported the Democratic Alliance and later in the 2019 South African general election, the group endorsed the Socialist Revolutionary Workers Party.

According to president S'bu Zikode the group aspires to an "ethics of living communism", as it campaigns on land and housing issues. A key slogan of the group is 'Don't Talk About Us, Talk To Us'. AbM has received support from church leaders and participates in the Poor People's Alliance, a network of radical grassroots movements in South Africa. It has also made solidarity links with other groups worldwide. At the same time, the group has faced sustained, and at times violent, repression. As of October 2022 it claims to have more than 115,000 members in good standing. More than twenty of its leaders have been murdered, something it blames on the ANC. The assassinations of Abahlali baseMjondolo members and leaders was discussed at the United Nations Human Rights Council in 2022.

History 

In 2001, the eThekwini Metropolitan Municipality, which governs the city of Durban and surrounding places including Pinetown, embarked on a slum clearance program. Shack settlements were demolished and there was a refusal to provide basic services (for example electricity and sanitation) to existing settlements on the grounds that all shack settlements were now temporary. Following these demolitions, some shack dwellers were simply left homeless and others were subjected to unlawful forced evictions then moved to the rural periphery of the city.

Abahlali baseMjondolo (AbM) formed out of a series of housing protests in 2005.
 Firstly, 750 people from the Kennedy Road shack settlement in Durban blockaded the N2 freeway for four hours with a burning barricade. There were 14 arrests. The group's original work from 2005 onwards was primarily committed to opposing demolitions and forced removals and to struggling for good land and quality housing in the cities. In most instances, this involved a demand for shack settlements to be upgraded or for new houses to be built close to where the existing settlements were. AbM argued that basic services such as water, electricity and toilets should be immediately provided to shack settlements while land and housing are negotiated and also engaged in mass actions providing access to water and electricity. AbM quickly had a considerable degree of success in stopping evictions and forced removals, winning the right for new shacks to be built and gaining access to basic services.

The United Nations expressed serious concerns in early 2008 about the treatment of shack dwellers in Durban. In late 2008, the AbM President S'bu Zikode announced a deal with the eThekwini Municipality which would see services being provided to 14 settlements and tenure security and formal housing to three. The municipality confirmed this deal in February 2009. AbM has been involved in considerable conflict with the eThekwini Municipality and has undertaken numerous protests and legal actions. Its members have been beaten and its leaders arrested by the South African Police Service in Sydenham, Durban. AbM has often made claims of severe police harassment, including torture. On a number of occasions, these claims have been supported by church leaders and human rights organisations. AbM has successfully sued the police for unlawful assaults on its members. In October 2009, it won a court case on appeal which declared the KZN Slums Act unconstitutional. There was acute conflict between AbM and the Cape Town City Council in 2009. This centred on the Macassar Village Land Occupation. There was similar conflict in 2013 around the Marikana Land Occupation. There was also concern about the possibility of evictions linked to the 2010 FIFA World Cup.

Academic work on Abahlali baseMjondolo stresses that it is non-professionalised (i.e. its leaders are nonsalaried), independent of NGO control, autonomous from political organisations and party politics and democratic. Sarah Cooper-Knock describes the movement as "neurotically democratic, impressively diverse and steadfastly self-critical". Ercument Celik writes that "I experienced how democratically the movement ran its meetings." A 2006 article in The Times stated that the movement "has shaken the political landscape of South Africa." Academic Peter Vale writes that Abahlali baseMjondolo is "along with the Treatment Action Campaign the most effective grouping in South African civil society." Khadija Patel has written that the movement  "is at the forefront of a new wave of mass political mobilisation".

Abahlali baseMjondolo is the largest shack dweller's organisation in South Africa and campaigns to improve the living conditions of poor people and to democratise society from below. AbM makes considerable use of cellphones to organise, generates its own media where possible and has made use of films too. The award-winning documentary feature film Dear Mandela tells the story of three young activists in Abahlali baseMjondolo.

AbM also runs formal education courses and issues certificates. The University of Abahlali baseMjondolo teaches through song and discussions, and archives the knowledge production process. It also hosts regular seminars. It runs the Frantz Fanon School, a political school, in the eKhenana Commune, one of its affiliated occupations..

As of October 2022 it claims to have more than 115 00 members in good standing. More than twenty of its leaders have been murdered, something it blames on the ANC. The assassination of Abahlali baseMjondolo members and leaders was discussed at the United Nations Human Rights Council in 2022.

Campaigns 

Since 2005, the movement has carried out a series of large scale marches, engaged in direct action such as land occupations, self organised water and electricity connections and made tactical use of the courts. The movement has often made anti-capitalist statements, has called for "a living communism", and has demanded the expropriation of private land for public housing.

During the COVID-19 pandemic in South Africa, AbM called a halt to all its planned events, including the annual UnFreedom Day rally. It also warned that most precautions against the virus assumed that people had access to sanitation and running water, a situation that was not the case for many of its members living in shacks. Ronald Lamola, Minister of Justice and Correctional Services, introduced a moratorium on evictions during lockdown (which began 27 March 2020) yet the eThekwini Metropolitan Municipality carried out evictions in Durban affecting around 900 people. Three of the settlements were Azania, eKhenana Commune and Ekuphumeleleni, all affiliated with AbM. Azania was squatted on 26 February 2019 and it was completely evicted, affecting around 300 people, two of whom were shot with live ammunition.

Land and housing

Abahlali baseMjondolo campaigns for well-situated urban land for public housing and has occupied unused government land. A primary demand of the movement has been for decent, public housing and much of its work takes the form of opposing evictions. The movement has often used the phrase 'The Right to the City' to insist that the location of housing is critically important and demands that shack settlements are upgraded where they are and that people are not relocated to out of town developments. The movement rejects technocratic approaches to the housing crisis and stresses the need for dignity to be central to the resolution of the housing crisis. It is opposed to shack dwellers being moved into 'transit camps'. The movement opposes all evictions and forced removals and has campaigned vigorously on this score via public protest and, also, legal action.

Land occupations organised by Abahlali baseMjondolo include Macassar Village (2009), Marikana (Cape Town) (2013) and Marikana (Durban) (2013). AbM activists set up the eKhanana Land Occupation in 2018, in Cato Crest, Durban. The Anti-Land-Invasion Unit demolished and burnt 50 shacks, but the occupation continued. In 2019 the occupiers won the right to remain on the land.

Service delivery

Abahlali baseMjondolo has also campaigned for the provision of basic services to shack settlements. Between 2003 and 2008, there was an average of ten shack fires every day and someone perishing every second day. AbM has campaigned on this issue demanding, amongst other things, the electrification of shacks. It has also connected thousands of people to electricity. The movement campaigns for equal access to school education for poor children. AbM has organised a number of mutual aid projects: crèches, kitchens and vegetable gardens.

Fighting the KZN Slums Act

The KwaZulu-Natal Elimination and Prevention of Re-emergence of Slums Act was introduced in 2007 by the Provincial Government of KwaZulu-Natal. It gave landowners and municipalities increased powers to evict tenants and squatters. AbM went to court in an attempt to have the act declared unconstitutional, but lost the case. On 14 May 2009, it took the case on appeal to the Constitutional Court. The judgment was handed down on 14 October 2009 and the movement won the case with costs.

Xenophobia and police brutality

AbM took a strong stand against the xenophobic attacks that swept the country in May 2008. There were attacks in townships against migrants from Mozambique and Zimbabwe, resulting in over fifty deaths. AbM released a statement in Afrikaans, English, isiZulu, German and Portuguese, declaring, "a person cannot be illegal [...] don't turn your suffering neighbours into enemies." Sociologist Michael Neocosmos saw this as the "most important statement on the xenophobic violence" and praised the fact that it was a shack-dweller group addressing the issue.

There were no attacks in any Abahlali settlements. The movement was also able to stop an in-progress attack in the (non-Abahlali affiliated) Kenville settlement and to offer shelter to some people displaced in the attacks.

The movement has organised numerous actions against police racism and brutality and has often demanded fair access to policing services for shack dwellers.

2010 FIFA World Cup

The 2010 FIFA World Cup was hosted by South Africa. In the leadup to the event, with 450,000 people expected to visit, there were concerns that the interests of the poor were being ignored as roads were rebuilt and new stadiums built.
Thousands of people were evicted and in October 2009, armed men attacked a shanty town in Durban, killing two people and demolishing thirty homes. S'bu Zikode commented in The Guardian "The government is focusing on the international visitors rather than poor communities. The role of the poor is seemingly to work hard in hotels, soccer stadiums and other facilities for the world's benefit, but then be kicked out of the cities and not share in the profits."

A security plan costing 1.3 billion rand (£98 million) involved sites being protected by 41,000 police officers equipped with water cannons, drones and helicopters. Whilst the cup cost an estimated £4 billion in total to put on, 43% of South African adults remained unemployed. The Western Cape branch of AbM threatened to build shacks outside of the Cape Town stadium to draw attention to their situation. However, they were not able to make good on this threat.

Philosophy 

Abahlali baseMjondolo describes itself as "a homemade politics that everyone can understand and find a home in" and stresses that it moves from the lived experience of the poor to create a politics that is both intellectual and actional. A slogan of the group is 'Don't Talk About Us, Talk To Us'. Its key demand is that the social value of urban land should take priority over its commercial value and it campaigns for the public expropriation of large privately owned landholdings. The key organising strategy is to try "to recreate Commons" from below by trying to create a series of linked communes.

Its philosophy has been sketched out in a number of articles and interviews. The key ideas are those of a politics of the poor, a living politics and a people's politics. A politics of the poor is understood to mean a politics that is conducted by the poor and for the poor in a manner that enables the poor to be active participants in the struggles conducted in their name. Practically, it means that such a politics must be conducted where poor people live or in places that they can easily access, at the times when they are free, in the languages that they speak. It does not mean that middle-class people and organisations are excluded but that they are expected to come to these spaces and to undertake their politics there in a dialogical and democratic manner. There are two key aspects to the idea of a living politics. The first is that it is understood as a politics that begins not from external theory but from the experience of the people that shape it. It is argued that political education usually operates to create new elites who mediate relationships of patronage upwards and who impose ideas on others and to exclude ordinary people from thinking politically. This politics is not anti-theory – it just asserts the need to begin from lived experience and to move on from there rather than to begin from theory (usually imported from the Global North) and to impose theory on the lived experience of suffering and resistance in the shacks. The second key aspect, of a living politics, is that political thinking is always undertaken democratically and in common. People's politics is opposed to party politics or politicians' politics (as well as to top down undemocratic forms of NGO politics) and it is argued that the former is a popular democratic project undertaken without financial reward and with an explicit refusal of representative roles and personal power while the latter is a top down, professionalised representative project driven by personal power.

While the movement is clear that its key immediate goals are 'land and housing' it is equally clear that it sees its politics as going beyond this. S'bu Zikode has commented that: "We have seen in certain cases in South Africa where governments have handed out houses simply to silence the poor. This is not acceptable to us. Abahalali's struggle is beyond housing. We fight for respect and dignity. If houses are given to silence the poor then those houses are not acceptable to us."

'Abahlalism' has on occasion been described as anarchist or autonomist in practice. This is primarily because its praxis correlates closely with central tenets of anarchism, including decentralisation, opposition to imposed hierarchy, direct democracy and recognition of the connection between means and ends. However, the movement has never described itself as either anarchist or autonomist. Zikode has said that the movement aspires to "an ethics of living communism".

Elections
Abahlali baseMjondolo, together with similar grassroots movements in Johannesburg and Cape Town, has traditionally taken a critical stance towards state elections in South Africa. It boycotted the local government elections in 2006, the national government elections in 2009 and the 2011 local government elections under the banner of No Land! No House! No Vote!. It has a history of conflict with both the African National Congress and the Democratic Alliance. Academic work contends that in this way the movement has protected its autonomy from political parties and NGOs. The Mail & Guardian reported that "Nearly 75% of South Africans aged 20–29 did not vote in the 2011 [local government] elections" and that "South Africans in that age group were more likely to have taken part in violent street protests against the local ANC than to have voted for the ruling party".

S'bu Zikode commented "The government and academics speak about the poor all the time, but so few want to speak to the poor...It becomes clear that our job is just to vote and then watch the rich speak about us as we get poorer" and Abahlali baseMjondolo's Deputy President, Lindela Figlan, has argued that "voting someone into government just gives them power to oppress and exploit us." Despite this sentiment, at the AbM "Unfreedom Day" rally held in Kwa-Mashu on 27 April 2014, the movement's President Sbu Zikode announced that they "would abandon their No Land, No House, No Vote campaign and cast a "strategic vote" in the May 7 elections". A few days later Zikode signed a pact with the centrist Democratic Alliance (DA), stating that "We encourage our comrades and our membership to vote for the Democratic Alliance so that we can get rid of corruption". Zikode clarified that "Abahlali are not joining DA or any political party. We will remain independent from all kinds of mainstream political parties. But this time around it's a tactical partnership where the aim is to really get rid of the party that has become a threat to the society". The DA welcomed Abahali's endorsement, stating that this had come after two years of engagement.

The group announced in 2019 that the only political party which had its support in the general election was the Socialist Revolutionary Workers Party (SRWP). which performed poorly, A spokesperson said "We still maintain that we are a movement that fights for people's rights and dignity. SRWP is the only party which speaks the same language as us, and although our vote is for them, we remain an independent civic organisation". The party did not win any seats in the election.

Repression 

In the early years of Abahlali baseMjondolo, individuals in the ruling party often accused it of being criminals manipulated by a malevolent white man, a third force, or a foreign intelligence agency. The movement, like others in South Africa, suffered sustained illegal harassment from the state. There were more Than 200 arrests of Abahlali members in the first last three years of the movement's existence and repeated police brutality in people's homes, in the streets and in detention. On a number of occasions, the police used live ammunition, armoured vehicles and helicopters in their attacks on unarmed shack dwellers. In 2006 the local city manager, Mike Sutcliffe, unlawfully implemented a complete ban on Abahlali's right to march which was eventually overturned in court. Abahlali were violently prevented from accepting invitations to appear on television and radio debates by the local police. The Freedom of Expression Institute has issued a number of statements in strong support of Abahlali's right to speak out and to organise protests. The Centre on Housing Rights and Evictions and a group of prominent church leaders have also issued public statements against police violence, as has Bishop Rubin Philip in his individual capacity, and in support of the right of the movement to publicly express dissent. In March 2008, The Mercury newspaper reported that both Human Rights Watch and Amnesty International were investigating human rights abuses against shack dwellers by the city government.

Repression began to take a new from in 2009 when a youth meeting was attacked in the Kennedy Road settlement on 26 September 2009. A mob of 40 people entered the settlement wielding guns and knives and attacked an Abahlali baseMjondolo youth meeting. Two people were killed in the resulting conflict. following which twelve members of a dance group affiliated to the movement were arrested and charged with murder. The Mail & Guardian newspaper described the arrests as Kennedy Road as a "hatchet job." On 18 July 2011, the case against the twelve accused was eventually thrown out of court. The Socio-Economic Rights Institute of South Africa issued a statement saying that the "charges were based on evidence which now appears almost certainly to have been manufactured" and that the Magistrate had described the state witnesses as ""belligerent", "unreliable" and "dishonest". Amnesty International noted that the court had found that "police had directed some witnesses to point out members of Abahlali-linked organisations at the identification parade".

IRIN, the newsletter of the UN Office for the Coordination of Humanitarian Affairs, reported in April 2010 that "The rise of an organised poor people's movement [Abahlali baseMjondolo] in South Africa's most populous province, KwaZulu-Natal, is being met with increasing hostility by the ruling African National Congress (ANC) government" and in April 2013 the movement successfully sued the Minister of Police for violence against three of its members.

On 26 June 2013, Nkululeko Gwala, an AbM leader in Cato Crest, was the first member of the movement to be assassinated. 
 Hours before the murder, an ANC politician had said he was a trouble-maker. In the same year Nqobile Nzuza was shot dead by police at the Durban Marikana land occupation in September 2013, at the age of 17. The following year Thuli Ndlovu, the chairperson of the movement's branch in KwaNdengezi was assassinated in her home on 29 September 2014.
 AbM accused the councillor of having a hand in the assassination. On 27 February 2015, the local councillor, Mduduzi Ngcobo, was arrested on suspicion of being behind the murder. Ngcobo and Velile Lutsheko (another ANC councillor) were sentenced to life imprisonment for the murder. Mlungisi Ndlovu, the gunman they had hired, was handed a sentence of 12 years in jail. Following these three killings numerous murders of AbM members were reported.

After a call was made for eThekwini Mayor Zandile Gumede to step down to face charges of racketeering and fraud, the Durban offices of AbM were burgled in May 2019. No money was taken but two computer hard drives were stolen. When Zikode said he was concerned by the timing of the burglary, the mayor's representative replied: "This is an old, repeated, fabricated allegation by Abahlali ... they must approach relevant security agencies if they have evidence instead of the media".

As of 2022 the movement claims that 24 of its members have been killed. According to Nomzamo Zondi, director of a pro-bono law firm, "From the 24 Abahlali activists who have been killed; 14 of them were assassinated by izinkabi (hired assassins), six of them were killed by security forces and one child who was two weeks old was killed while sleeping from teargas fumes during a violent eviction in Foreman Road."

The assassination of Abahlali baseMjondolo activists was discussed at the 51st sessions of the United Nations Human Rights Council in 2022.

Church support

Abahlali baseMjondolo has received strong support from some key church leaders such as Bishop of Natal, Rubin Phillip. In a speech at the AbM UnFreedom Day event on 27 April 2008 Phillip said:

The Italian theologian Brother Filippo Mondini has attempted to develop a theology based on the political thought and practices developed in Abahlali baseMjondolo.

The Poor People's Alliance

In September 2008, Abahlali baseMjondolo, the Western Cape Anti-Eviction Campaign, the Landless People's Movement and the Rural Network (Abahlali baseplasini) formed The Poor People's Alliance. The Anti-Eviction Campaign's chairman said "We are calling it the Poor People's Alliance so our people can identify with it". The coalition has repeatedly clashed with the ANC. The Poor People's Alliance refuses electoral politics under the slogan "No Land! No House! No Vote!". Abahlali baseMjondolo has also organised in solidarity with the Unemployed Peoples' Movement.

International solidarity
Worldwide, Abahlali baseMjondolo has solidarity links with many other groups, such as Sendika in Istanbul and the Combined Harare Residents' Association in Harare. In the US, it is connected to Domestic Workers United, The Poverty Initiative, Picture the Homeless and the Movement for Justice in el Barrio in New York. It is also supported by the Movement Alliance Project in Philadelphia and Take Back the Land in Miami

There is an AbM Solidarity Group in England and the movement has links with the London Coalition Against Poverty and War on Want. In Italy, AbM is connected to Clandestino and the Comboni Missionaries.

Criticisms

According to eThekwini city manager Dr. Michael Sutcliffe, the essence of the tensions between Abahlali baseMjondolo and the city lie in the movement's "rejection of the authority of the city." When the Durban High Court ruled that his attempts to ban marches by AbM were unlawful he stated that: "We will be asking serious questions of the court because we cannot allow anarchy having anyone marching at any time and any place." According to Lennox Mabaso, spokesperson for the Provincial Department of Housing, the movement is "under the sway of an agent provocateur" who is "engaged in clandestine operations" and who has been "assigned to provoke unrest". City Officials continue to argue that the movement is a Third Force seeking to undermine the ruling African National Congress for nefarious purposes.

In December 2006, AbM and the Western Cape Anti-Eviction Campaign, disrupted a meeting of the Social Movements Indaba (SMI) at the University of KwaZulu Natal. A member of the SMI collective said to the Mail & Guardian "they insulted us, using abusive language and all that macho lingo" whilst S'bu Zikode asserted denied any verbal violence. Since then, AbM has refused to work with SMI. AbM has also criticised the Centre for Civil Society at the University of KwaZulu-Natal and from 2006 onwards has refused to work with it.

AbM of the Western Cape called for a month of direct action in October 2010. Mzonke Poni, the chairperson of the Cape Town structure at the time, publicly endorsed road blockades as a legitimate tactic during this strike. The Treatment Action Campaign (TAC) and the South African Communist Party, the latter a major ally of the ruling ANC, issued strong statements condemning the campaign and labelling it 'violent' and, 'anarchist' and reactionary'. AbM responded by saying that their support for road blockades was not violent and that "We have never called for violence. Violence is harm to human beings. Blockading a road is not violence." They also said that the SACP's attack was really due to the movement's insistence on organising autonomously from the African National Congress. After the strike by AbM Western Cape, there were some protests in TR section of Khayelitsha in which vehicles were damaged. AbM WC ascribed these protests to the ANC Youth League as did Helen Zille and the Youth League itself. According to Leadership Magazine "The ANC Youth League in the province has hijacked the peaceful service-delivery protests organised by the social movement Abahlali baseMjondolo in Khayelitsha in a violent, destructive and desperate attempt to mobilise support for the ANC against the province's Democratic Alliance provincial and municipal governments."

List of notable current and former Abahlali baseMjondolo activists

See also

 Fanmi Lavalas in Haiti
 The Homeless Workers' Movement in Brazil
 The Landless Workers' Movement in Brazil
 The Landless People's Movement in South Africa
 Movement for Justice in el Barrio in the United States of America
 Take Back the Land in the United States of America
 The Western Cape Anti-Eviction Campaign in South Africa

References

External links 
Abahlali baseMjondolo official website
A Digital Archive of Abahlali baseMjondolo History from March 2005 to November 2006 (with links to pictures, articles, press releases etc.) at the MetaMute site
Revolutionary Ubuntu – The shack dwellers and poor people of South Africa (pdf)

Films about Abahlali baseMjondolo
 Amnesty International Film on Abahlali baseMjondolo
 Dear Mandela by Dara Kell & Christopher Nizza, 2011 
 Txaboletan bizi direnak by Elkartasun Bideak, 2009 (English dialogue with Basque subtitles)
 Amandla Awethu by Elkartasun Bideak, 2009
 From the Shacks to the Constitutional Court by Dara Kell & Christopher Nizza, 2009
 A Place in the City by Jenny Morgan, 2008
 The Right to Know: The Fight for Open Democracy in South Africa by Ben Cashdan, 2007
 Nayager Falls, Abahlali Rises by Sally Gilles and Fazel Khan, 2007
 Breyani & the Councillor by Sally Gilles and Fazel Khan, 2006
 Kennedy Road and the Councillor by Aoibheann O'Sullivan, 2005

Affordable housing advocacy organizations
Anarchism in South Africa
Civil disobedience
Communism in South Africa
Durban
Homelessness organizations
Housing in South Africa
Land rights movements
Political organisations based in South Africa
Politics of South Africa
Shack dwellers' movements
Social movements in South Africa
Squatters' movements
Zulu words and phrases